The Linguistic Atlas Project (LAP), is a survey-based research project directed by Hans Kurath in 1929, with the purpose to record words and pronunciation of everyday American English around the country. The Linguistic Atlas Project was first created by the American Dialect Society to create an American Linguistic Atlas. Throughout this project, a little over 5000 individuals have been interviewed or surveyed across the country. The main goal of the project was to develop maps to show different variants of lexical corpus, phonology, and grammaticality by regional location. Over time, Kurath’s students and other researchers branched out and started regional projects at different universities in the United States of America. Throughout this research project, over 800 topics have been discussed in most of the regions, including topics like family and social connections, items and activities that may be found at home, agriculture, and the weather. At the beginning of this project, there was no such thing as a tape recorder, therefore professionally trained field workers created very detailed phonetic transcriptions of each interview, which allowed them to document the pronunciation.

Project overviews

Linguistic Atlas of the Gulf States (LAGS) 

Originally directed by Lee Paterson, and now taken over by William A. Kretzchmar Jr, the Linguistic Atlas of the Gulf States (LAGS), covers eight states including Florida, Georgia, Tennessee, Alabama, Mississippi, Louisiana, Arkansas, and Texas. In the time span of 1968 to 1983, 914 speakers were interviewed and recorded using a 104 page document of questions designed to capture specific southern speech characteristics.

Digital Archive of the Southern Speech (DASS) 

Directed by William A. Kretzchmar, Jr., the Digital Archive of the Southern Speech (DASS), covers eight states including; Florida, Georgia, Tennessee, Alabama, Mississippi, Louisiana, Arkansas, and Texas. Interviews were conducted by interviewers.

Linguistic Atlas of the Middle and South Atlantic States (LAMSAS) 

Originally directed by Hans Kurath, later taken over by Raven I. McDavidd, Jr, but now directed by William A. Kretzchmar, Jr. The Linguistic Atlas of the Middle and South Atlantic States (LAMSAS), covers the mid Atlantic states (New York, New Jersey, Pennsylvania, and West Virginia), and the South Atlantic states (Delaware, Maryland, Virginia, North Carolina, South Carolina, Eastern Georgia, and Northeastern Florida). 1,162 interviews were covered using a 104 page document of questions designed to capture specific speech characteristics. The data (manuscripts) collected from 1933–1974 is located in the Special Collection Repository of the University of Kentucky Library. Only the recorded tapes that were shared in the LAGS project survived.

Linguistic Atlas of the North-Central States (LANCS) 

Directed by Han Kurath, the Linguistic Atlas of the North-Central States (LANCS), covers seven states including; Wisconsin, Michigan, Illinois, Indiana, Ohio, Kentucky, and Southern Ontario. Surveys were conducted using a 75 page questionnaire. The data collected between 1933–1978, include 564 interviews, with only 154 audio tapes surviving. These manuscripts are located in the Special Collections Repository of the University of Kentucky Library.

Linguistic Atlas of New England (LANE) 

Directed by Hans Kurath, the Linguistic Atlas of the North-Central States (LANE), covers the New England States of Massachusetts, New Hampshire, Connecticut, Vermont, New York (Long Island), Rhodesia Island, Maine, and Southern New Brunswick. During the time span of 1931–1933, using a 750 item questionnaire, there were 416 speakers interviewed throughout 213 communities. Records are now digitized by the library of congress.

Linguistic Atlas of Oklahoma (LAO) 

Originally directed by William R. Van Riper, but now directed by Raven I. McDavid, Jr, Bruce Southard, and Dennis Preston, the Linguistic Atlas of Oklahoma, covers the State of Oklahoma. The project involves 57 Oklahoma speakers from 1960–1962, interviewed using the questionnaire in the Linguistic Atlas Formula.

Linguistic Atlas of the Pacific Northwest (LAPNW) 

Originally directed by Carroll Reed, later directed by David Carlson, the Linguistic Atlas of the Pacific Northwest (LAPNW), covers Oregon, Washington, and Idaho. Using a 73 page questionnaire in the linguistic atlas format, 51 participants were interviewed and surveyed. Copies of transcribed words and phrases collected from the project are located in the Special Collections Repository of the University of Kentucky Library.

Linguistic Atlas of the Pacific Coast (LAPC) 

Originally Directed by David Reed, later directed by Allen Metcalf, the Linguistic Atlas of the Pacific Coact (LAPC), covered California and Nevada. Using a 73 page questionnaire in the linguistic atlas format, 270 participants from California and 30 participants from Nevada were interviewed. In the time span of 1952–1959, 300 field records and a checklist with over 500 vocabulary words were collected. This data was collected by 10 fieldworkers.

Linguistic Atlas of the Western States (LAWS) 

Originally Directed by Lee Paterson, now directed by William A. Kretzchmar, Jr. the Linguistic Atlas of the Western States (LAWS), covered Colorado, Utah, and Wyoming. Interviews began in 1988, with a total of 280 interviews, including; 15 in Wyoming, 28 in Colorado, and 22 in Utah 22. These interviews were recorded and examined pronunciation, vocabulary, and grammar.

Overall history 
The objective of the Linguistic Atlas Project (LAP) started in 1929, was to collect a variety of English dialects across the country. Thousands of interviews using written responses, voice recordings, video recordings, and anything that included a human voice was used by researches to collect samples. The process was lengthy due to researchers traveling, getting acquainted with locals, recording and analyzing data. With expenses and the limited funding, the collections of samples made the process even longer. Digitalizing current records have been the most difficult process due to the outdated technology used to collect the data. With the new technology invented over the years, the process has become less difficult to make the recordings and transferring them.

Current history 
The project is currently held at the University of Kentucky and was previously housed and originated at UGA. An online site has been put together that allows anyone to view and utilize the decades worth of linguistic data, that was not accessible to the public back then until now. During this time no new records have been taken, however there are several cases that are in the process of being started.

References 

Language geography
Linguistic atlases